Elika Abdolrazzaghi (born August 9, 1979) is an Iranian actress. She has received various accolades, including a Hafez Award.

Filmography

Film

Television

Short film 

 Dandâne Âbi (Houman Seyyedi)
 Yek Menhâye Binahâyat (Rasoul Ghasemi)
 Sefr (Reza Sanjabi)
 Da'vat (Mahdi Karampoor)

Theater

Telefilm 

 Inja Aseman Hamishe Abri nist (Mahdi Golestaneh, 2013)
 Hesse Tamas (2012)
 Mardane Zamin (Mahdi Sabbaq zad, 2011)
 Yek Eshtebahe Kuchulu (Afsaneh Monadi, 2010)
 Hagho sokout (2010)
 Mah Az ruye Sakku (Arash Moayyerian, 2008)
 Hamchon Yek Roya (Mohammadali Najafi, 2008)

Awards and nominations 

 Winner of the statue of Hafez, the best comedian actress from the twelfth film and television festival of the world of images to play in the series Ghahveye Talkh, 2012.

References

External links 

 
 
 

1979 births
Living people
Iranian comedians
People from Tehran
Iranian film actresses
Iranian stage actresses
Iranian stand-up comedians
Iranian television actresses
People from Ramsar, Mazandaran